Hennie van der Velde (born 9 July 1944) is a Dutch former swimmer. She competed in the women's 4 × 100 metre freestyle relay at the 1960 Summer Olympics.

References

External links
 

1944 births
Living people
Olympic swimmers of the Netherlands
Swimmers at the 1960 Summer Olympics
Sportspeople from Utrecht (city)
Dutch female freestyle swimmers
20th-century Dutch women